Artelida pernobilis is a species of beetle in the family Cerambycidae. It was described by Van de Poll in 1890.

References

Dorcasominae
Beetles described in 1890